Hamilton Group is the north-eastern US geological structure.

See also
 Hamiltonian group, mathematical structure
 Hamilton Project, research organization
 A predecessor of the Open Software Foundation